The 2007–08 Toto Cup Leumit was the 19th time the cup was being contested. The final was played at Haberfeld Stadium on 18 December 2007.

The winners were Hapoel Petah Tikva, beating Hakoah Amidar Ramat Gan 2–0 in the final.

Group stage

Group A

Group B

Semifinals

Final

See also
 Toto Cup
 2007–08 Liga Leumit
 2007–08 in Israeli football

External links
 Toto Cup Leumit 2007/2008 IFA 

Leumit
Toto Cup Leumit
Israel Toto Cup Leumit